Ekaterina Besikievna Kotrikadze (born 23 March 1984) is a Georgian-Russian journalist and media manager, host of the Dozhd TV channel and the former head of the information service of the RTVI TV channel.

Early life 
Ekaterina Kotrikadze was born in Tbilisi, Georgian Soviet Socialist Republic. In 2005 she graduated with honours from the Faculty of Journalism of Moscow State University.

Her mother died in the explosion of house number 19 on Guryanov Street in Moscow in 1999; their apartment was above the epicenter of the explosion.

Career 
From 2003 to 2005, Ekaterina worked on the Dangerous Zone programme on the TVC channel.

In 2006 she returned to Georgia. The first place of work in Georgia was the Alania TV channel, where Kotrikadze started from the position of an ordinary reporter, having worked for three years. At the same time, in 2008, she began cooperation on the RTVI channel as a correspondent for Georgia. In 2009 she began working for the Russian radio station Echo of Moscow.

Ekaterina headed the information service and in 2011 she took the position of general director, in 2012 – chief editor of the information service.

In 2012, after the closure of the FIC channel, she accepted RTVi's invitation to become head of the information service and form the channel's editorial policy. In 2016, after Alexey Pivovarov joined the channel as general producer and editor-in-chief, she was appointed deputy editor-in-chief.

In February 2018, she accused Leonid Slutsky, a member of the Russian State Duma from the Liberal Democratic Party, of sexual harassment.

In April 2019, she was invited as a speaker on the topic of the safety of journalists at the international journalism festival in Perugia, Italy.

In June 2020, she went on maternity leave, and later left RTVi.

Since September 2020, she has been a host of the Dozhd TV channel.

Personal life 
Ekaterina Kotrikadze's first husband was Egor Kuroptev. Her second husband was Alexey Zyunkin and the couple have a son, David.

In 2019, she married Russian journalist Tikhon Dzyadko.

References 

1984 births
Living people
TV Rain
RTVI
Journalists from Georgia (country)
American journalists
American women journalists
Russian journalists
Russian women journalists
Russian activists against the 2022 Russian invasion of Ukraine
Russian people of Georgian descent
Redkollegia award winners